Bohlin Cywinski Jackson is a United States-based architectural practice that was founded in 1965 in Wilkes-Barre, Pennsylvania by Peter Bohlin and Richard Powell. Bohlin's firm then merged with John F. Larkin and Bernard Cywinski's Philadelphia-based architectural practice, Larkin Cywinski, in 1979. It is recognized for its distinguished portfolio of residential, university, commercial, cultural and government projects.

Design 
Bohlin Cywinski Jackson is known for emphasizing a strong relationship between buildings and their physical surroundings. They were an early advocate of sustainable design and subsequently received national awards from the American Institute of Architects Committee on the Environment. Their buildings include the Liberty Bell Center, Apple Fifth Avenue in New York City, Seattle City Hall and the Discovery and Visitor Center at Grand Teton National Park.

Architects 
Current principal architects of the firm include Peter Bohlin, Frank Grauman, William Loose, Cornelius Reid, Karl Backus, Gregory Mottola, Robert Miller, Steven Chaitow, David Murray, Raymond Calabro, Gabriel Hodge, and Thomas Kirk.

History 
The modern firm was created in 1979 through the merger of the firm of Philadelphia-based architects John F. Larkin and Bernard Cywinski and that of Peter Bohlin, whose architectural firm was based in Wilkes-Barre, Pennsylvania, at the time. According to The Philadelphia Inquirer, Bohlin and Cywinski had been drawn together through a shared interest in sketching . Bernard Cywinski died in 2011, at the age of 70.

Awards 
In 1994, the practice received the American Institute of Architects Firm Award, which recognizes the design work of an entire firm. In 2010, founding partner Peter Bohlin, FAIA received the AIA Gold Medal, the highest honor given by the American Institute of Architects to an individual. In 2013, BCJ was the recipient of the Architectural Record Good Design is Good Business Lifetime Achievement Architecture Award.
The firm has received numerous awards for the designs of libraries, visitor centers, housing, and sustainable design.
In 2012 they won the EuroShop RetailDesign award for the Uniqlo flagship store in Shanghai based on the strength of its spectacular dynamic merchandising. The centre of the building contains the main attraction: a striking 20-metre high atrium with "flying mannequins" moving from top to bottom at a pace set by music.

Projects 
 Copperhill Mountain Lodge: Åre, Sweden
 Grand Teton National Park Discovery and Visitors Center: Jackson, Wyoming
 Apple Store: Fifth Avenue
 Uniqlo Flagship Store Shanghai
 Apple Store: SoHo
 Apple Store: Upper West Side
 Apple Store: 14th Street
 Apple Store: Boylston Street
 Apple Store: Regent Street, London
 Apple Store: Carrousel du Louvre, Paris
 Apple Store: Sydney, Australia
 Apple Store: Ginza, Japan
 Apple Store: Shinsaibashi, Japan
 Apple Store: San Francisco
 Apple Store: Chestnut Street
 Apple Store: Scottsdale, Arizona
 Apple Store: North Michigan Avenue
 The Episcopal Academy Newtown Square, Pennsylvania
The William J. Nealon Federal Building and Courthouse: Scranton, Pennsylvania
 The Pocono Environmental Education Center: Dingmans Ferry, Pennsylvania
 Seattle City Hall: Seattle, Washington (in joint venture with Bassetti Architects)
 Mills College, Lorry I. Lokey Graduate School of Business: Oakland, California
 Pixar Headquarters: Emeryville, California
 Adobe Systems: San Francisco, California
 Liberty Bell Center: Philadelphia, Pennsylvania
 The Barn at Fallingwater, for the Western Pennsylvania Conservancy
 Ballard Library & Neighborhood Service Center: Ballard, Seattle
 Bill Gates House, Medina, Washington
 Williams College, North & South Academic Buildings: Williamstown, Massachusetts
 Forest House: Connecticut
 The Ledge House: Maryland
 Creekside House: California
 Umerani Residence: California
 House at the Shawangunks: New York
 Combs Point Residence: New York
 Envelope House: Washington
 Gosline House: Washington
 Woodway Residence: Washington
 Lily Lake Residence: Pennsylvania
 House in the Blue Mountains: Pennsylvania
 House in the Endless Mountains: Pennsylvania
 Waverly: Pennsylvania
 Point House: Montana
 House on Lake Tahoe: Nevada
 Farrar Residence: Utah
 Maxwell School of Citizenship and Public Affairs
 Fisher Science and Academic Center, Bard College at Simon's Rock
 Sellinger School of Business and Management, Loyola University Maryland
 Winchester Thurston School, North Hills Campus: Pittsburgh, Pennsylvania
 The Walt Disney Company, Grand Central Creative Campus: Glendale, California
Newport Beach Civic Center and Park
Lauder College House, University of Pennsylvania: Philadelphia, Pennsylvania
New College House West, University of Pennsylvania: Philadelphia, Pennsylvania
Clough Undergraduate Learning Commons, Georgia Institute of Technology: Atlanta, Georgia
Marcus Nanotechnology Building. Georgia Institute of Technology: Atlanta, Georgia

Publications 
 Liberty Bell Center: Bohlin Cywinski Jackson, 2006 
 Grand Teton: A National Park Building, 2009 
 Details in architecture: creative detailing by some of the world's leading architects. 1999  
 Arcadian Architecture: Bohlin Cywinski Jackson-12 Houses, Oscar Riera Ojeda, Thomas Fisher, 2005 
 Bohlin Cywinski Jackson: The Nature of Circumstance: Bohlin Cywinski Jackson, 2010 
 Bohlin Cywinski Jackson: Farrar: Ojeda, Fisher (Introduction), 2007 
 Bohlin Cywinski Jackson: Listening: Rizzoli, 2015

References

External links 
 
 American Institute of Architects Press release 2010 Gold Medal

Architecture firms based in Pennsylvania
1965 establishments in Pennsylvania
American companies established in 1965
Wilkes-Barre, Pennsylvania